Del Debbio is a surname of Italian origin. Notable people with this surname include:

 Armando Del Debbio (1904 - 1984), Brazilian footballer who played in the role of left back
 Enrico Del Debbio (1891 – 1973), Italian architect and university professor
 Marcelo Del Debbio (born 1974), Brazilian architect

Italian-language surnames